James P. Lucier (born 1934 or 1935) is an author and a former staff member of the United States Senate.

Early life and education
Lucier has a bachelor's degree in radio and television journalism from the University of Detroit, where he co-founded the educational station WDET, and a doctoral degree in English literature from the University of Michigan.

Career
After completing his doctorate, Lucier was associate editor of the Richmond News Leader, in Virginia; he caused controversy by writing critically of President Kennedy shortly after his assassination. Also in 1963 he wrote for American Opinion, the magazine of the right-wing John Birch Society, accusing African leaders of embracing socialism as "abundance without necessitating the earning of it".

Lucier was a Senate staff member for 25 years. After working for South Carolina Southern Democrat and later Republican Senator Strom Thurmond, he joined the staff of North Carolina Republican Senator Jesse Helms, initially as coordinator of domestic legislative policy, then as chief legislative aide for foreign affairs. He became minority staff director for the Senate Foreign Relations Committee when Helms became its ranking minority member in February 1987. A leader of the hard-line faction among Republican staffers, he was relieved of his position in a general shake-up by Helms in 1992, being replaced by James "Bud" Nance, a retired admiral and friend of Helms'.

In 1972, Lucier established Capitol Information Services, for which he worked part-time at the beginning of his employment with Helms; in 1986 the Charlotte Observer raised questions about the ethics of a Senate aide running such a business. While working for Helms, he and another aide to Helms, John Carbaugh, were criticized for profiting from private foundations they had set up with Helms, and were accused of meddling in foreign policy on Helms' behalf, particularly when both attended and attempted to influence the Lancaster House talks between Britain and Rhodesia.

He subsequently became senior editor of the news weekly Insight, and has also served as chairman of the advisory commission for the Thomas Balch Library and a member of the board of the James Monroe Museum and Senior Fellow of the Monroe Foundation.

In 2006 he was appointed head of the Program on the Middle East and the Iran Information Center at the Institute on Religion and Public Policy.

Publications
In 2001 he published The Political Writings of James Monroe, one of a series on presidential writings commissioned by the publisher. For his work on the book, he was appointed one of six scholars in the Congressional Reading Room at the Library of Congress.

References

1930s births
Living people
American male writers
University of Detroit Mercy alumni
Horace H. Rackham School of Graduate Studies alumni